Momchil Emilov Tsvetanov (born 3 December 1990) is a Bulgarian professional footballer who plays for Botev Vratsa. Although he predominantly plays as a winger, he has also been deployed as a left-back.

A product of Spartak Pleven's youth academy, he has represented Bulgaria at all youth levels. Tsvetanov was part of U19 squad for the 2008 UEFA European Under-19 Championship.

Club career

Spartak Pleven
Born in Pleven, Tsvetanov began his career playing for local club Spartak. On 9 September 2006, at the age of 16 he made his professional debut in the B Group, playing the second half of a 3–0 defeat to Minyor Pernik. He scored his first goal on 7 April 2007 against Hebar Pazardzhik in a 2–0 home league victory. He made 15 league appearances, scoring three goals during his debut season. In the following season Tsvetanov scored four goals in 12 matches.

Litex Lovech

In January 2008, Tsvetanov joined Litex Lovech on a four-and-a-half year contract for an undisclosed fee. He made his competitive debut in the A Group in a 0–0 draw against CSKA Sofia on 1 March 2008. He played for 45 minutes.

On 12 July 2011, Tsvetanov assisted Svetoslav Todorov twice in a 2–1 away win over Mogren Budva in the second qualifying round of the 2011–12 Champions League.

Botev Plovdiv
After six years in Lovech, Tsvetanov surprisingly signed a two-year contract with Botev Plovdiv as a free agent on 21 August 2014. He made his league debut for Botev three days later when he came on as 73rd-minute substitute in a match against Slavia Sofia which Botev won 2-0.

Momchil Tsvetanov played in 14 games in A Grupa and 3 games for the Bulgarian Cup without scoring any goals and without making any assists. He failed to impress and at the end of the season his contract was terminated by mutual agreement.

CSKA Sofia
On 30 June 2015, Tsvetanov joined CSKA Sofia. He lost his first choice status when the team was reinstated to the A PFG.

Vereya
In July 2016, he signed a contract with newly promoted top division club Vereya.

Stal Mielec
On 11 July 2017, Tsvetanov signed with I liga side Stal Mielec.

Slavia Sofia
On 5 February 2018, Tsvetanov confirmed to the media that he had signed with Slavia Sofia.

On 12 July 2018, Tsvetanov scored his first-ever goal in European competition, netting only goal in a 1–0 away win against FC Ilves in the first qualifying round of the 2018–19 UEFA Europa League.

Lokomotiv Plovdiv
On 15 June 2019 Tsvetanov won his 5th Bulgarian Cup and 1st for his new club Lokomotiv Plovdiv. On 1 July 2020 he won the Bulgarian Cup again, scoring the last penalty kick in the shoot-out against CSKA Sofia.

Gangwon FC
On 20 July 2021, Korean K League 1 side Gangwon FC announced they have signed Tsvetanov.

International career
He made his debut for Bulgaria national football team on 25 March 2021 in a World Cup qualifier against Switzerland.

Career statistics
As of 20 March 2021

Honours

Club
Litex Lovech
Bulgarian League (2): 2009–10, 2010–11
Bulgarian Cup (2): 2007–08, 2008–09
Bulgarian Supercup: 2010

CSKA Sofia
 Bulgarian Cup: 2015–16

Slavia Sofia
 Bulgarian Cup: 2017–18

Lokomotiv Plovdiv
 Bulgarian Cup (2): 2018–19, 2019–20
 Bulgarian Supercup: 2020

References

External links

1990 births
Living people
Sportspeople from Pleven
Bulgarian footballers
Bulgaria youth international footballers
Bulgaria under-21 international footballers
PFC Spartak Pleven players
PFC Litex Lovech players
Botev Plovdiv players
PFC CSKA Sofia players
FC Vereya players
Stal Mielec players
PFC Slavia Sofia players
PFC Lokomotiv Plovdiv players
Gangwon FC players
Anagennisi Karditsa F.C. players
First Professional Football League (Bulgaria) players
Second Professional Football League (Bulgaria) players
I liga players
K League 1 players
Super League Greece 2 players
Bulgarian expatriate footballers
Bulgarian expatriate sportspeople in Poland
Expatriate footballers in Poland
Bulgarian expatriate sportspeople in South Korea
Expatriate footballers in South Korea
Bulgarian expatriate sportspeople in Greece
Expatriate footballers in Greece
Association football midfielders
Bulgaria international footballers